Anania hasanensis is a moth in the family Crambidae. It was described by Valentina A. Kirpichnikova in 1998. It is found in Primorsky Krai in the Russian Far East.

References

Moths described in 1998
Pyraustinae
Moths of Asia